Rajiv Gandhi University of Health Sciences (RGUHS), centered in Bengaluru, India, is a public, affiliating university set up in 1996 by the government of Karnataka, India, for the regulation and promotion of higher education in health sciences throughout the state of Karnataka. RGUHS is a member of Association of Commonwealth Universities, UK.

It is the largest health sciences university in India.

Nursing colleges affiliated with RGUHS 
There are 435 nursing colleges affiliated with RGUHS.

References

External links

 

Medical and health sciences universities in India
Medical colleges in Karnataka
Universities in Bangalore
1996 establishments in Karnataka
Educational institutions established in 1996